The  is a satellite modem peripheral produced by Nintendo for the Super Famicom in 1995. Containing 1 megabyte of ROM space and an additional 512 kB of RAM, Satellaview allowed players to download games, magazines, and other media through satellite broadcasts provided by Japanese company St.GIGA. Its heavy third-party support included Squaresoft, Taito, Konami, Capcom, and Seta. To use Satellaview, players purchased a special broadcast satellite (BS) tuner directly from St.GIGA or rented one for a six-month fee, and paid monthly subscription fees to both St.GIGA and Nintendo. It attaches to the expansion port on the bottom of the Super Famicom.

Satellaview is the result of a collaboration between Nintendo and St.GIGA, the latter known in Japan for its "Tide of Sound" nature sound music. By 1994, St.GIGA was struggling financially due to the Japanese Recession affecting the demand for its music; Nintendo initiated a "rescue" plan by purchasing a stake in the company. Satellaview was produced by Nintendo Research & Development 2, the same team that designed the Super Famicom, and was made for a more adult-oriented market. By 1998, Nintendo's relationship with St.GIGA was beginning to collapse due to St.GIGA's refusal of a debt-management plan and failure to secure a government broadcasting license. Nintendo withdrew support for Satellaview in March 1999, with St.GIGA continuing to supply content until June 30, 2000, when it was fully discontinued.

Consumer adoption of Satellaview was complicated by the rise of technologically superior fifth-generation consoles such as the Sega Saturn, PlayStation, and Nintendo 64, and by Satellaview's high cost, especially due to its exclusive availability via mail order and specific electronic store chains. However, St.GIGA reported more than 100,000 subscribers by March 1997. Retrospectively, Satellaview has been praised by critics for its technological accomplishments and its overall library quality, particularly of the Legend of Zelda series. In recent years, it has gained a strong cult following due to much of its content being deemed lost media, with video game preservation groups recovering and hosting its games and other services online.

History
Founded in early 1990, St.GIGA was a satellite radio subsidiary of the Japanese satellite television company WOWOW, Inc, based in Akasaka, Tokyo. Credited as the world's first digital satellite radio station, it was maintained by Hiroshi Yokoi and best known for its "Tide of Sound" broadcasts, which were high-quality digital recordings of nature sounds accompanied by a spoken word narrator known as the "Voice". The company was initially a success, and is recognized for its innovative concept and nonstandard methodology. It later began releasing albums featuring its own music as well as foreign music such as Hearts of Space and various compositions by Deep Forest, and various pieces of merchandise such as program guides and "sound calendars". By 1994, St.GIGA struggled financially due to the Japanese Recession reducing consumer spending on ambient music and satellite systems. Nintendo purchased a 19.5% stake in St.GIGA in May, as a way to "rescue" the company and help to successfully restructure it.

Satellaview development began shortly after the acquisition, reportedly in production alongside the Virtual Boy and Nintendo 64. While Nintendo was producing the peripheral, St.GIGA revamped its broadcasting schedule to include a new programming block, the "Super Famicom Hour" providing gameplay tips and news for Nintendo's upcoming Super Famicom games. St.GIGA would provide the necessary satellite and broadcasting services, and host many of its older music and Tide of Sound broadcasts, and Nintendo and other third-party developers would create games and other content for the service. Nintendo stressed to video game publications that much of Satellaview's content, specifically St.GIGA broadcasts, were primarily for adults, with video games constituting only a small portion of airtime.

Several third-party developers, such as Capcom, Taito, Konami, Seta, and Squaresoft, then announced plans to produce Satellaview games. The peripheral was designed by Nintendo Research & Development 2, the same team that had designed the Super Famicom. Though Nintendo was in a slump due to falling Super Famicom game sales and the Virtual Boy's failure, its management remained confident in Satellaview's success and would help calm any consumer concerns; company president Hiroshi Yamauchi expected to sell roughly 2 million Satellaview units each year. Pre-orders were available beginning February 25, 1995. Broadcasting services for Satellaview launched on April 1, and the peripheral was released on April 24. It was only sold via mail order, instead of being released into stores. Satellaview was never released outside Japan, which some publications cited as being due to expensive costs of digital satellite broadcasting, and due to a supposed lack of appeal to American consumers. When the service first launched, St.GIGA had a number of issues regarding broadcasting video games and video game-related services through the Satellaview service, such as legal issues with other companies and technical restraints of the time. In June 1996, Nintendo announced a potential partnership with Microsoft to release a similar service for Windows, which would combine St.GIGA's broadcasting services with dial-up Internet; this was never launched. By March 1997, St.GIGA reported that Satellaview had 116,378 active users.

By mid 1998, Nintendo's relationship with St.GIGA began to deteriorate. St.GIGA refused a debt-management plan created by Nintendo to reduce the firm's capital, though having ¥8.8 billion in debt, and had also failed to apply for a government digital satellite broadcasting license by a deadline. This led to Nintendo halting all production of new games and content for the peripheral beginning March 1999, and to cancel content and services via a new BS-4 satellite. St.GIGA continued to supply content for Satellaview, broadcasting reruns of older content and making the service only for video games. Satellaview was fully discontinued on June 30, 2000, due to a severe lack of outside support and a dwindling player base, dropping by nearly 60% from its peak in 1997 to about 46,000 active subscribers. One year later, St.GIGA declared bankruptcy and merged with Japanese media company WireBee, Inc.

Technical specifications

A Satellaview device attaches to the expansion port on bottom of a Super Famicom, similar to the 64DD or the Sega CD. Its power transfer bracket supplies the Super Famicom. The peripheral expands the Super Famicom with 1 MB of ROM space and 512 kB of RAM. A Satellaview device is packaged with a custom four-way AC adapter and AV selector, connecting the console to the required BS tuner. Game and broadcast information is stored on 8 MB memory packs, inserted into the top of a special application cartridge. These memory packs can be rewritten with new content, including by certain Super Famicom games, such as RPG Maker 2. A vintage user purchased (or rented for six months at ) a BS tuner from St.GIGA, paid monthly fees to St.GIGA and Nintendo, and bought a satellite dish.

The requisite system cartridge, titled BS-X: Sore wa Namae o Nusumareta Machi no Monogatari (commonly translated as BS-X: The Town Whose Name Was Stolen), serves as both an interactive menu system and as its own game. The game features an EarthBound-like hub world, based on buildings representing each of Satellaview's services. Players can create a custom avatar, purchase items found in stores scattered across the map, play minigames, read announcements by St.GIGA and Nintendo, and participate in contests. The cartridge increases the Super Famicom's hardware performance with extra RAM.

Games and services

A total of 114 games were released for Satellaview; some are remakes or updates of older Family Computer and Super Famicom games, and others were created specifically for the service. Nintendo's popular franchises include Kirby, F-Zero, Fire Emblem, The Legend of Zelda, and Super Mario Bros. Nintendo's original games include Sutte Hakkun. EarthBound creator Shigesato Itoi designed a fishing game called Itoi Shigesato no Bass Tsuri No. 1. The previously unreleased Special Tee Shot, later reworked into Kirby's Dream Course, was released. Third-party games include Squaresoft's Radical Dreamers and Treasure Conflix, Pack-In-Video's Harvest Moon, Chunsoft's Shiren the Wanderer, Jaleco's Super Earth Defense Force, and ASCII's Derby Stallion '96. Soundlink games were broadcast with live voice acting by radio personalities and commentators. Unlike other Satellaview games, SoundLink games could only be played on a live schedule. Nintendo often held tournaments for certain games, such as Wario's Woods, that allowed players to compete for prizes.

Alongside games, Satellaview subscribers could access many other different services. Free magazines included video game publications like Famitsu and Nintendo Power and general Japanese publications focusing on news, music, or celebrity interviews. Soundlink magazines included commentary, often by popular Japanese personalities, such as Bakushō Mondai and All Night Nippon. St.GIGA broadcasts included "Tide of Sound" nature ambiance and other music. A special newsletter by both St.GIGA and Nintendo included service updates such as contests and upcoming events.

Reception and legacy
Though having amassed a larger playerbase, and being widely-successful for St.GIGA, Nintendo viewed Satellaview as a commercial failure. The rise of technologically superior consoles such as Sega Saturn, PlayStation, and Nintendo 64, made consumers reluctant to purchase Satellaview, especially due to its exclusive availability via mail order delivery or specific electronic stores.

Retrospective feedback on Satellaview has been positive. Retro Gamer magazine applauded the peripheral for its technological achievements, providing an early form of online gaming decades before the advent of services such as Xbox Live. It commended the overall quality of the game library, citing the definitive BS Legend of Zelda series. Nintendo World Report liked its uniqueness which will likely never be replicated on modern video game consoles, and its library of games and services. Shacknews listed it among Nintendo's most innovative products for its technological accomplishments and pioneering of online gaming. Kill Screen labeled Satellaview as "perhaps one of the most crucial early experiments in combining games with storytelling", specifically the Soundlink games and voice acting. They were disappointed at the loss of the entire Soundlink live content library upon discontinuation. Video Games Chronicle called it "an impressive and ingenious idea for the time, and an innovation that we see to a lesser degree now in terms of interactive television and episodic game installments from modern studios".

In 1999, Nintendo released a spiritual successor to Satellaview for Nintendo 64, the 64DD and its Randnet Internet service. Originally announced in 1995, a year prior to console launch, Randnet had many similar features, such as a Nintendo newsletter and online gaming, plus chat and email. Nintendo attempted to have St.GIGA transition from Satellaview to the 64DD, however, when St.GIGA refused, Nintendo instead partnered with Japanese media company Recruit to form Randnet. The 64DD was a commercial failure.

Satellaview has a large cult following since the late 2000s due to most of its content having been lost after the service was closed. Many video game preservationists and Nintendo fans have searched for memory packs to recover game data and preserve it online. Fans have created custom private servers that work with the official BS-X application cartridge, and translated certain games such as those from the Legend of Zelda series. In retrospective years, publications have raised concerns about the permanent loss of much Satellaview content, specifically live audio from Soundlink games and digital newsletters.

See also 
 Nintendo Power (cartridge)

Notes

References

Modems
Online video game services
Super Nintendo Entertainment System accessories
Video game console add-ons
Japan-only video game hardware
Products introduced in 1995